Luther Carter may refer to:

 Luther C. Carter (1805–1875), U.S. Representative from New York
 Luther F. Carter (born 1950), president of Francis Marion University